The Custom of the Country is a 1913 tragicomedy of manners novel by the American author  Edith Wharton. It tells the story of Undine Spragg, a Midwestern girl who attempts to ascend in New York City society.

Plot summary
The Spraggs, a family of newly wealthy midwesterners from Apex, arrive in New York City to advantageously marry off their beautiful, ambitious, and temperamental daughter, Undine. Attracted to glamour and extravagance Undine has a hard time making in roads into the high status old money social circles she wishes to enter. Her beauty catches the attention of several men who offer her a tantalizing glimpse into their world. Ralph Marvell, who is descended from the Dagonets, an old money family, becomes attracted to Undine. Convinced that Undine is a simple and plain spoken girl who would be ruined by her elevation in society he resolves to quickly woo and marry her. However Marvell is an unsuccessful lawyer and a would-be poet and his family no longer has great reserves of cash. Before the marriage his grandfather informs Mr. Spragg that Spragg will have to financially support the couple. Mr. Spragg asks Undine to break off her engagement but Undine, now aware that the Marvells and the rest of their social circle highly value sexual purity and frown upon broken engagements and divorce, refuses to leave Ralph and her father relents to the marriage. Shortly before her wedding, Undine encounters an acquaintance from Apex named Elmer Moffatt.  Undine begs him not to make their acquaintance known as it could compromise her relationship with Ralph. Elmer agrees, but later approaches Mr. Spragg and leverages the fact that the Spraggs are embarrassed to know him to coerce Mr. Spragg into a business deal that profits them both greatly.

Ralph and Undine marry quickly and honeymoon in Europe. Although Ralph dotes on Undine, their relationship quickly comes into conflict. Neither one of them enjoy the other's activities and his attempts to be a moderating influence on her extravagance is ignored. Worst of all his finances do not permit the lifestyle Undine desires. After Undine's father is unable to send them money Undine forces Ralph to extract money from his sister and her husband which Ralph resents. At the end of their honeymoon Undine discovers that she is pregnant. She is horrified by the news and Ralph realizes he is as well.  

Four years later Undine misses her son Paul's birthday causing Ralph to realize that he is no longer in love with her. The couple are deeply in debt due to Undine. She resents Ralph for his lack of funds while he resents her for forcing him to work. Unable to cover her bills Undine accepts a loan from Peter Van Degen, the nouveau riche husband of Ralph's cousin Clare. Peter is a known philanderer and Undine flirts with him hoping that by hinting at an affair she will extract more financial aid. However when Peter abruptly leaves for France Undine realizes that she would be happier if she divorced Ralph and married Peter. Undine fakes an illness so that Ralph will send her to France to recover. While there she convinces Peter to leave Clare and marry her. 

After Undine and Ralph's divorce Peter reunites with Clare and refuses to see Undine. She later learns from a friend that while Clare would never have agreed to a divorce the real reason that Peter dropped Undine was that he discovered that the day they ran away together Ralph was deeply ill and was pleading for her to come home. Peter's fear that Undine would do the same to him led him to break off their relationship. 

Her circumstances and social status greatly reduced Undine returns to Paris where she is fortunate enough to meet a French count, Raymond de Chelles, who falls in love with Undine. The de Chelles are Catholics and frown upon Undine's marriage and divorce. Undine discovers that an annulment is possible but does not have the financial means to procure one. She runs into Elmer Moffat who suggests that she use her legal hold on her son, Paul, to extract the money from Ralph.

Ralph, whose family has been raising Paul since his divorce, is shocked to discover that Undine now wants him to live in France with her. His cousin Clare points out that rather than legally fight for custody he should offer Undine a large amount of money to keep Paul. Ralph borrows off his inheritance and goes to Elmer Moffat in the hope of doubling his money. However the funds do not come through in time and at the same time Elmer informs him that he and Undine were married years ago in Apex. In shock and grief Ralph commits suicide. His son is his sole heir and when the funds Ralph invested finally do come through they are controlled entirely through Undine who, through Ralph's death, is now able to marry Raymond. 

Undine is soon dissatisfied with Raymond, too.  The de Chelles are hidebound aristocrats, their wealth tied up in land and art and antiques that they will not consider selling, and Undine cannot adjust to the staid customs of upper-class French society.  She also resents having to spend most of her time in the country because her husband cannot pay for expensive stays, entertainment, and shopping trips in Paris.  

Undine at last runs into Elmer Moffat, now extremely wealthy and successful. They renew their acquaintance and Undine realizes that he is the only man she has ever really loved. She suggests that they begin an affair which will be tolerated by her husband and his family as long as they are discreet. To her surprise Elmer refuses and insists that he will only renew their relationship if she divorces Raymond and marries him. 

Now, married to the crass midwestern businessman who was best suited to her in the first place, Undine finally has everything she ever desired.  Still, it is clear that she wants even more: in the last paragraph of the novel, she imagines what it would be like to be an ambassador's wife – a position closed to her owing to her divorces.

Characters
 Undine Spragg, a young woman, the protagonist
 Mr. Abner E. Spragg, a financier; he is manipulated by Moffatt to invest in his career early on
 Mrs. Leota B. Spragg, a housewife
 Elmer Moffatt, a cunning financier from Apex whom Undine marries then divorces and remarries
 Ralph Marvell, a New York society gentleman who marries Undine, has a son with her and is then divorced by her
 Peter Van Degen, a man with whom Undine has an affair,
 Clare Van Degen, married to Van Degen, unhappy with their marriage; she is Ralph Marvell's cousin who is deeply in love with him
 Charles Bowen, an elderly man from New York City, who acts as a kind of observer; friend of Laura Fairford
 Raymond De Chelles, a French aristocrat who marries Undine after she is widowed; he is her third husband
 Paul Marvell, Undine's and Ralph's child, Raymond's stepson
 Laura Fairford, Ralph Marvell's sister; due to the customs of the era, she needed to invite Undine to dinner in order for Ralph to indirectly see her again
 Henley Fairford, husband to Laura Fairford
 Claud Walsingham Popple, a painter who paints a portrait of Undine
 Mrs. Heeny, a masseuse who keeps company first with Undine and Mrs. Spragg and later with Undine and her son; she also keeps clippings of all high society events
 Celeste, Spragg family's French maid.
 Jim Driscoll, An American Ambassador to England, whom Undine wishes to Marry

Title
The title phrase is discussed in the novel. Charles Bowen asserts to Laura Fairford that it is "abnormal" that Ralph Marvell does not share his business life with his wife Undine. He does not "let her share in the real business of life" nor "rely on her judgment and help in the conduct of serious affairs". He believes that this behavior is typical of American men who, unlike Europeans, spend money on their wives but undervalue them as individuals, while living passionately in their business lives. To do otherwise, says Bowen, would be "against the custom of the country". (Chapter XV)

Edith Wharton said the title of the novel came from a play by English playwrights John Fletcher and Philip Massinger, entitled The Custom of the Country, in which the term referred to the droit du seigneur, the claim of a ruler to have sex with a subordinate female before her husband.

In popular culture
Julian Fellowes has cited The Custom of the Country as an inspiration for his creative work, including Downton Abbey. Upon receiving the Edith Wharton Lifetime Achievement Award in 2012 in Boston, Massachusetts, Fellowes said: "It is quite true that I felt this was my book; that the novel was talking to me in a most extreme and immediate way. I think it's a remarkable piece of writing. In Undine Spragg, Wharton has created an anti-heroine absolutely in the same rank as Becky Sharp, Scarlett O'Hara, or Lizzie Eustace. Undine has no values except ambition, greed and desire, and yet through the miracle of Wharton's writing, you are on her side. That's what's so extraordinary about the book...I decided, largely because of her work, that it was time I wrote something."

In 2020 American filmmaker Sofia Coppola announced she planned to develop a miniseries adaptation of the work.

Vanity in The Custom of the Country 

Undine Spragg in The Custom of the Country acts as if she is entitled to a rich, luxurious lifestyle. One scholar writes: "Her rise through the ranks of New York society from the nouveau riche demonstrates her ability to use marriage and divorce in order to achieve her desire for social dominance." Undine has allowed a "consumerist society" to shape her personalities as the scenery changes throughout the book. "Wharton personifies consumer culture through Undine Spragg, demonstrating how individual agency gets lost when involved in the system."

Undine's name
The word "undine" was created by the medieval author Paracelsus, who used it for female water spirits.

Ralph Marvell recognizes the poetry in the name and assumes it refers to the poetic French phrase "divers et ondoyant" meaning "diverse and undulating". Mrs. Spragg responds by explaining the mundane origins or her daughters name. Undine was named for "a hair-waver her father put on the market the week she was born", itself taken from "UNdoolay, you know, the French for crimping". (Chapter V) The phrase appears in Montaigne's essay "By diverse means we arrive at the same end": "Truly man is a marvelously vain, diverse and undulating object.  It is hard to found any constant and uniform judgment on him."

References

External links

 
 
 

Campbell, M. (n.d.). Meaning, origin and history of the name Undine. Retrieved from https://www.behindthename.com/name/undine

1913 American novels
Novels by Edith Wharton